Manlio is a given name. Notable people with the given name include:

Manlio Argueta (born 1935), Salvadoran writer, critic and novelist
Manlio Bacigalupo (1908–1977), Italian football player and manager
Manlio De Angelis (1935–2017), Italian actor and voice actor 
Manlio Di Stefano (born 1981), Italian politician 
Manlio Fabio Beltrones (born 1952), Mexican economist and politician
Manlio Brosio (1897–1980), Italian lawyer, diplomat and politician 
Manlio Graziano, Italian geopolitician
Manlio Legat (1889–1915), Italian track and field athlete
Manlio Martinelli (1884–1974), Italian painter
Manlio Morgagni (1879–1943), Italian journalist and politician
Manlio Pastorini (1879–1942), Italian gymnast
Manlio Rho (1901–1957), Italian painter 
Manlio Rocchetti (1943–2017), Italian makeup artist
Manlio Di Rosa (1914–1989), Italian fencer
Manlio Sgalambro (1924–2014), Italian philosopher and writer
Manlio Simonetti (1926–2017), Italian biblical scholar 
Manlio Vitale (born 1949), Italian criminal 
Manlio Arena (born 1974), Brazilian & Italian Financier

Italian masculine given names